Magdiel is a Hebrew name associated with any of the following:

Place names
Magdiel, one of the founding communities now part of Hod Hasharon
Magdiel (school), a Youth Aliyah boarding school

Biblical reference
Magdiel is the name of an Edomite clan mentioned in Genesis 36:31-43.